Fernando Llorente Mañas (born 18 September 1990) is a Spanish professional footballer who plays for Gimnástica Segoviana CF as a central midfielder.

Club career
Born in Segovia, Castile and León, Llorente began his career in the youth ranks of Atlético Madrid before transferring to Villarreal CF, where he made his senior debut in their third team. His professional match with the latter club's reserves took place on 5 September 2009, when he came on as a late substitute for Joan Tomàs in a 3–1 away loss against Córdoba CF in the Segunda División, his only appearance of the season. He became a regular in 2011–12, and scored his first goal on 2 December 2011 as consolation in a 3–1 defeat at UD Las Palmas in the same competition.

On 9 July 2012, Llorente signed a two-year deal with second-division side CE Sabadell FC. On its expiration, he spent five months with Burgos CF of Segunda División B.

Llorente moved abroad for the first time on 18 June 2015, signing a two-year contract at Romanian Liga I club ACS Poli Timișoara. A year later he switched countries again to join C.F. Os Belenenses in the Portuguese Primeira Liga, but an injury-stricken pre-season and competition in midfield caused him to be given permission to leave just two months later, and he returned to Poli in September 2016.

In January 2017, Llorente returned to his country and its third tier, joining FC Cartagena. In the following years, he represented Real Murcia, CD Mirandés, Recreativo de Huelva, CF Rayo Majadahonda, Salamanca CF UDS and UD San Sebastián de los Reyes in the same league.

References

External links

1990 births
Living people
People from Segovia
Sportspeople from the Province of Segovia
Spanish footballers
Footballers from Castile and León
Association football midfielders
Segunda División players
Segunda División B players
Tercera División players
Primera Federación players
Segunda Federación players
Villarreal CF C players
Villarreal CF B players
CE Sabadell FC footballers
Burgos CF footballers
FC Cartagena footballers
Real Murcia players
CD Mirandés footballers
Recreativo de Huelva players
CF Rayo Majadahonda players
Salamanca CF UDS players
UD San Sebastián de los Reyes players
Liga I players
ACS Poli Timișoara players
C.F. Os Belenenses players
Spanish expatriate footballers
Expatriate footballers in Romania
Expatriate footballers in Portugal
Spanish expatriate sportspeople in Romania
Spanish expatriate sportspeople in Portugal